Elkay Manufacturing Company is a manufacturer of stainless steel sinks, faucets, drinking fountains, bottle fillers and branded commercial interiors, was started in 1920 by Leopold & his two sons Louis and Marcel (known as Max) 
Katz and Ellef Robarth, a tinsmith who came up with an idea to hand fabricate German silver sinks and deliver them in Chicago. Today, still privately owned by the founding family, Elkay has 3,500 employees worldwide and is America's largest stainless steel sink company. Over the years the products Elkay manufactures have expanded to include sinks, faucets, water coolers, drinking fountains, water bottle fillers, and residential and commercial kitchen and bath products.

History
The Elkay Manufacturing Company was founded in 1920 by Leopold Katz and his sons Louis and Max . It started with three employees in rented premises in Chicago's Near North Side. During World War II, Elkay supplied sinks and commodes to equip the U.S. Military.

In 2010, Elkay launched the EZH2O Water Bottle Filler, which has been recognized for contributing to keeping plastic bottles out of landfills. The unique counter on the unit allowed for users to see how many bottles had been saved from landfills at a particular location, which had the effect of “making the thing go viral”. The EZH2O first came about when Elkay business travelers started noticing their fellow travelers doing "the airport dance." More people were toting plastic water bottles. Rather than drinking from the fountain, they wanted to refill those jugs. It wasn't working. The dance was a sort of shuffle done by travelers trying to tilt bottles at the proper angle for refilling without splashing water on their shoes.

In 2013, Elkay Manufacturing, won an international trade case involving anti-dumping and anti-subsidy petitions filed by the company and "unlawful pricing by Chinese producers of drawn stainless steel sinks which caused material injury to ELKAY Manufacturing Company and other domestic producers."

Elkay acquired Interior Systems, Inc. in 2017, growing Elkay's business into the interior design, build, and commercial project management space. Interior Systems’ nationwide presence in the restaurant, education, hospitality, and retail markets was a natural fit when Elkay looked to expand business operations. Elkay Interior Systems later acquired competitors in China, Austria and Washington, DC.

Elkay sold its Wood Products Division to ACPI in January, 2019. 

In October, 2019, Ric Phillips replaced Tim Jahnke as President and CEO. In March 2020, Elkay announced the retirement of Board Chairman Ron Katz. Former President and CEO Tim Jahnke was named as his successor.

In January 2020, the company celebrated its 100th Anniversary.

In February 2022, Zurn Water Solutions announced they had reached a "definitive agreement to combine" with Elkay, in an all-stock transaction.

Products 
Elkay currently has four main product categories – Coolers; Sinks, Faucets and Accessories; Commercial Interior Design; Foodservice and Millwork. Their breadth of plumbing products includes 4,000 SKUs of kitchen sinks made of a variety of different materials.[2] Elkay manufactures residential kitchen and commercial products, such as sinks, bars, faucets, cabinets and commercial kitchen appliances. They are the largest sink manufacturer in the world and the largest water cooler offering in the market.[2] Most recently, Elkay elaborated on water cooler units by creating bottle filler units that can both retrofit to existing water cooler units, or stand-alone. These units decreased plastic waste through promotion of using reusable plastic bottles. Their most popular bottle filler unit model is the ezH2O.[12]  Elkay products are sold through distributors, designers, home center establishments and various internet retailers.

Divisions
Elkay Manufacturing has several divisions:

•	Elkay Plumbing manufactures Elkay sinks, drinking fountains and coolers, LIV, EZH2O, water bottle filling stations, Smartwell water delivery systems, Halsey Taylor, and Revere sinks

•	Elkay Interior Systems provides turnkey commercial front of house interior design and build services for restaurants, hospitality and cafeteria environments 

•	Elkay Commercial Systems provides engineering, global sourcing, and back of house manufacturing in the restaurant, retail, and hospitality markets.

Facilities
Elkay Manufacturing is based in Downers Grove, Illinois, with fifteen offices, distribution and manufacturing facilities across the United States and international operations in Mexico, China, Hong Kong, Austria and Cyprus.

Major competitors

Blanco
Ebac Ltd.
Fortune Brands, Inc.
Haws Corporation
Kohler Co.
Masco Corporation
Native Trails
OASIS International
Primo Water Corporation

References

Privately held companies based in Illinois
Building materials companies of the United States
Manufacturing companies based in Chicago
Manufacturing companies established in 1920
Bathroom fixture companies
1920 establishments in Illinois